Shailendra (30 August 1923 – 14 December 1966) was a popular Indian Hindi-Urdu Poet, lyricist and film producer. Noted for his association with the filmmaker Raj Kapoor, singer Mukesh, and the composers Shankar–Jaikishan, he wrote lyrics for several successful Hindi film songs in the 1950s and the 1960s.

Biography 
Shankardas Kesarilal - Shailendra was born in Rawalpindi, Punjab - now in Pakistan. His ancestors belonged to Ara district of Bihar. He was born into a Dalit family belonging to the Chamar caste and lost his mother and sister at a young age. His village in bihar mostly comprised agricultural laborers and Shailendra’s father had shifted to Rawalpindi to find work at a military hospital.
Shailendra came in contact with Indra Bahadur Khare at the Kishori Raman Vidyalay (Now Kishori Raman Inter College) Mathura. Both started composing poems, sitting on the rock located on the bank of a pond in between railway 27 quarters and railway line near to Mathura station. Afterwards Shailendra moved to Bombay for films and Indra Bahadur Khare got his fame in Raashtreey Kavita.

Career as a lyricist

Shailendra started his career as an apprentice with Indian Railways in Matunga workshop, Bombay in 1947. He started writing poetry during these days.

The filmmaker Raj Kapoor noticed Shailendra, when the latter was reading out his poem Jalta hai Punjab at a mushaira (poetic symposium). Kapoor offered to buy the poem Jalta Hai Punjab written by Shailendra and for his movie Aag (1948). Shailendra, a member of the left wing Indian People's Theatre Association (IPTA), was wary of mainstream Indian cinema and refused. However, after his wife became pregnant, Shailendra himself approached Raj Kapoor in need of money. At this time, Raj Kapoor was filming Barsaat (1949), and two of the film songs had not yet been written. For  500, Shailendra wrote these two songs: Patli kamar hai and Barsaat mein. The music for Barsaat was composed by Shankar–Jaikishan.[citation needed]

The team of Raj Kapoor, Shailendra and Shankar–Jaikishan went on to produce many other hit songs. The song "Awara Hoon" from the 1951 film Awaara, written by Shailendra, became the most appreciated Hindustani film song outside India at the time. Shailendra had penned down plenty songs lyrics for Raj Kapoor's film. Shree 420 released in 1955 is one of them. All songs of this film were super hits and till date people sing in various occasions. One can easily understand the power and magic of Shailendra's lyrics from the song "Pyaar hua iqaraar hua hai, Pyaar se phir kyo darta hai dil", is till date evergreen golden classic song of Bollywood.

In the days when composers would recommend lyricists to producers, Shankar–Jaikishan once promised Shailendra that they would recommend him around, but didn't keep their promise. Shailendra sent them a note with the lines, Chhoti Si Yeh Duniya, Pehchaane Raaste Hain. Kahin To Miloge, toh Poochhenge Haal ("The world is small, the roads are familiar. We'll meet sometime, and ask 'How do you do?'"). Shankar–Jaikishan realised what the message meant and having said sorry, turned the lines into a popular song. The song, sung by Kishore Kumar, was featured in the film Rangoli (1962), for which the producer Rajendra Singh Bedi wanted to sign up Majrooh Sultanpuri as the lyricist. However, Shankar–Jaikishan insisted on Shailendra and the producer had to oblige.

Apart from Shankar–Jaikishan, Shailendra also shared a rapport with composers such as Salil Chowdhary (Madhumati), Sachin Dev Burman (Guide, Bandini, Kala Bazar), and Ravi Shankar (Anuradha).  Apart from Raj Kapoor, he shared a rapport with filmmakers such as Bimal Roy (Do Bigha Zameen, Madhumati, Bandini) and Dev Anand (Guide and Kala Bazar).[citation needed]

Shailendra also wrote lyrics for several Bhojpuri films. Avijit Ghosh mentions in his book, Cinema Bhojpuri, that Shailendra penned songs for Ganga Maiya Tohe Piyari Chadhaibo (the first Bhojpuri film), Ganga, Mitwa and Vidhana Naach Nachave. In page 184, Ghosh also writes that Shailendra received the best lyricist award for Ganga Maiyya... for all Bhojpuri and Magadhi films released till then at a function held in April 1965 in Calcutta.

Last years 

In 1961 Shailendra invested heavily in the production of the movie Teesri Kasam (1966), directed by Basu Bhattacharya and starring Raj Kapoor and Waheeda Rehman. The film won the National Film Award for Best Feature Film. However, the film was a commercial failure. The falling health resulting from tensions associated with film production and anxiety due to financial loss, coupled with alcohol abuse, ultimately led to his early death.

Legacy 

Shailendra's son Shaily Shailendra also became a lyricist. At the age of 17, Raj Kapoor asked him to complete his father's song Jeena yahan, marna yahan for the film Mera Naam Joker. Shaily Shailendra completed the "mukhra" (lit. "face," or chorus) of the song whereas Shailendra completed the "antara" (verses) only before his demise. Lyricist, writer, and director  Gulzar has stated on  many occasions that Shailendra was the best lyricist produced by  the Hindi film industry.

Shailendra's song Mera Joota Hai Japani was featured in the 2016 Hollywood movie Deadpool (2016).
A street in the Dhauli Pyau locality of Mathura was named after Shailendra on March 9, 2016 - Geetkar-Jankavi Shailendra Marg – Mathura.
Shailendra spent 16 years of his early life in Mathura before moving to Mumbai to work for the Indian Railways in 1947.

Shailendra's wife is Shakuntala Shailendra and his five children are Late Shailey Shailendra, Manoj Shailendra, Mrs.Amla Mazumdar, Late Mrs. Gopa Chandra and Dinesh Shailendra.

Awards

Lyricist 
Shailendra won the Filmfare Best Lyricist Award three times.
 1958: "Yeh Mera Deewanapan Hai" (Yahudi)
 1959: "Sab Kuch Seekha Humne" (Anari)
 1968: "Main Gaoon Tum So Jao" (Brahmchari)

Producer 
As a producer Shailendra's film Teesri Kasam (1967) won prestigious National Film award of 1967 in the category Best feature film.

Popular songs 

Some of the popular songs written by Shailendra include: 
 "Suhana Safar Aur Yeh" – "Madhumati"
 "Chalat Musafir Moh Liya Re" – "Teesri Kasam"
 "Yeh Mera Diwanapan Hai" – "Yahudi"
 "Dil Ka Haal Sune Dilwala" – "Shri 420"
 "Tu Pyar Ka Saagar Hai" – "Seema"
 "Yeh Raat Bhigi Bhigi" – "Chori Chori"
 "Paan Khaye Saiya Hamaro" – "Teesri Kasam"
 "O Sajana, Barkha Bahar Aai" – "Parakh (1960 film)"
 "Aaja Aai Bahaar" - "Rajkumar"
 "Ruk Ja Raat, Thahar Ja Re Chanda" – "Dil Ek Mandir"
 "Yaad Na Jaye Bite Dino Ki" – "Dil Ek Mandir"
 "Chadh Gayo Paapi Bichhua" – "Madhumati"
 "Awara Hoon" – Awaara
 "Ramaiya Vastavaiya" – Shri 420
 "Mud Mud Ke Na Dekh" – Shri 420
 "Mera Joota Hai Japani" – Shri 420
 "Aaj Phir Jeene Ki" – Guide
 "Gata Rahe Mera Dil" – Guide
 "Piya Tose Naina Laage Re" – Guide
 "Kya Se Kya Ho Gaya" – Guide
 "Din Dhal Jaaye Haye" – Guide
 "Har Dil Jo Pyar Karega" – Sangam
 "Dost Dost Na Raha" – Sangam
 "Sab Kuchh Seekha" – Anari
 "Kisi Ki Muskurahaton Pe" – Anari
 "Dil Ki Nazar Se" – Anari
 "Khoya Khoya Chand" – Kala Bazar
 "Pyaar Hua Ikraar Hua" – Shri 420
 "Ajeeb Dastan Hai Yeh" – Dil Apna Aur Preet Parayi
 "Jhoomti Chali Hawa" – Sangeet Samrat Tansen
 "Jeena yahan marna yahan" – Mera Naam Joker
 "Nache Man Mora Magan" – "Meri Surat Teri Ankhen"
 "Sajan Re Jhooth Mat Bolo" – "Teesri Kasam"
 "Raat Ke Hamsafar, Thak Ke Ghar Ko Chale" – "An Evening in Paris"
 "Tu Zinda Hai To Zindagi Kay Jeet Par Yakeen Kar"

See also

 Shankar Jaikishan
 Hasrat Jaipuri

References

External links
 

Indian male songwriters
1923 births
1966 deaths
People from Mathura
Punjabi-language lyricists
People from Rawalpindi District
Filmfare Awards winners
People from Araria district
20th-century pseudonymous writers
Producers who won the Best Feature Film National Film Award